The 1961 Daytona 500, was a NASCAR Grand National Series event that was held on February 26, 1961, at Daytona International Speedway in Daytona Beach, Florida.

Marvin Panch won the race in the one-year-old 1960 Pontiac built and owned by Smokey Yunick after taking the lead on lap 187.  Panch was not originally scheduled to drive, and was only added to Yunick's team after Fireball Roberts suggested adding him.  Panch drove the number 20 to victory in three hours and 20 minutes.  The race was run in its entirety without a single caution flag.  Panch took the lead with 13 laps remaining when race leader Fireball Roberts' car suffered a blown engine.  The win was Panch's first, and only victory of the season.

Background 
Tragedy struck during the preliminaries of Daytona Speedweeks when a driver from Phoenix Arizona crashed in turn 3 of the  track. Harold Haberling was killed when his 1955 modified Chevy flipped in the 31-degree banking.  This was the first fatality at the facility since 1959.

One week prior to the Daytona 500 drivers competed in a first-ever  "compact car" race. Joe Weatherly would flip his 1960 Falcon upside down during the race, but no other cars were involved in the accident, and Weatherly was not injured. Weatherly then went on to win a 10-lap,  event dubbed a "Race of Champions" on the  banked tri-oval. Drivers competed in the same cars that they would run in the Daytona 500. The race proved to be a tough loss for Fireball Roberts, who had started at the rear of the field but managed to charge to the lead in only 4 laps. On the last lap, Weatherly overtook Roberts at the finish line, winning by only 2 feet.

A total of 70 drivers registered to run in the 1961 Daytona 500, but only the top 60 would be scheduled to start the race.  A total of 13 teams came to Daytona with the new, more aerodynamically designed 1961 Pontiacs contributed by the manufacturer.  Smokey Yunick brought Fireball Roberts as his primary driver for the new model vehicle, and it was Roberts who suggested that Yunick add teammate Marvin Panch.  Panch was a 'last minute' addition to Yunick's team and given the year-old 1960 Pontiac rather than one of the newer models.  When approached, Yunick relented to allowing Panch to drive Roberts' Pontiac Catalina from the previous year, saying: "If you think that much about [the '60 Pontiac], take it outside." [the shop], where the mechanics prepared the car for the 500.

During the initial 2-lap qualifying trials Fireball Roberts set a new track record of  average speed over the  run.  The second fastest average belonged to Joe Weatherly in his 1961 Pontiac, with Cotton Owens, Curtis Turner, and Marvin Panch rounding out the top 5.  Roberts broke the previous track record speed of  set by Jack Smith the previous July.  Roberts' effort was the first of three consecutive pole positions that he captured from 1961 through 1963.  The 3 "consecutive" poles was a first, and a record which Roberts still shares with Bill Elliott (1985–87) and Ken Schrader (1988–90).

Twin qualifying events 
The two qualifying events which established the starting lineup of the Daytona 500 were marred by multiple crashes in which at least one fan and seven drivers were injured on February 24, 1961.  A total of 34 drivers were scheduled for the first of two qualifying events, and 33 cars scheduled for the second event.  The top 20 finishers would secure positions in the upcoming  event, with winners of each qualifier also earning a $5,000 purse.  The top two time-trial qualifiers were also guaranteed the top two starting spots.

An accident early in the first event involved Dave Mader and Wes Morgan in which Morgan's car flipped seven times going into the 4th turn.  Both Lee Petty and son Richard Petty crashed during their respective  qualifying events, forcing Petty Enterprises into a noncompetitive role for the 1961 Daytona 500.  Son Richard crashed through the guardrail and suffered a sprained ankle in the first qualifier, and while the car remained upright, the crash kept him from starting the 500.  The wreck occurred when driver Junior Johnson got thrown out of control as debris from an earlier wreck caused a cut tire, and he made contact with the younger Petty's car.  The crash left Johnson with a severe gash to his chin, and Petty with shards of glass in his eye.  The younger Petty's crash brought out one of the five cautions in the first 40-lap qualifier,  which was shortened due to crashes at both ends of the track during the closing laps.

Shortly after Richard Petty left the infield medical center after the first race crash, his attention was drawn to an accident involving his father in the second race.  Patriarch Lee tangled with Johnny Beauchamp when Beauchamp caught Petty's back bumper sending the two cars through the guardrail which destroyed both vehicles.  The accident started when Banjo Matthews spun in front of the field while leading the second qualifying  race. The senior Petty suffered multiple life-threatening injuries, including numerous fractures, internal injuries, and a punctured lung.  When the two cars left the track, Petty's car struck spectator A. B. Kelley, who suffered severe cuts, but helped evacuate Petty from the twisted metal.  Beauchamp and Petty tore out 13 8-inch by 8-inch guardrail support posts while exiting the track.  There's been speculation that the early crash between Mader and Morgan may have weakened that section.  Some of the drivers felt that much of the blame for the multiple crashes lay in the fact that so many rookie drivers were not capable of running competently; and Joe Weatherly stated: “I know it was veteran drivers in the worst crashes, but it was rookies that caused them, dammit!”  Petty was hospitalized for over four months, but did recover.  While Beauchamp also suffered injuries to his head, they were less serious.  Petty and Beauchamp were no strangers to each other; having been involved in the iconic finish of the inaugural 1959 Daytona 500 where they crossed the finish line so close to each other that it took NASCAR 3 days before Bill France Sr. declared Lee Petty the winner.  Beauchamp never raced again after the accident; and while Petty did return to run a half-dozen races, the wreck effectively ended both driver's careers.  Driver Rex White stated that: “If NASCAR doesn’t have a meeting to educate some of these amateurs, there can’t be much of a race on Sunday. There were some goofballs on the track today.”, and even Fireball Roberts, winner of the first race, stated that:
  Fireball Roberts and Joe Weatherly each won their respective  qualifying events.

Qualifying race results

First qualifier
 Fireball Roberts '61 Pontiac
 Jim Paschal '61 Pontiac
 Jack Smith '61 Pontiac
 Buck Baker '61 Chrysler
 Ned Jarrett '61 Chevrolet
 Bobby Johns '61 Ford
 Nelson Stacy '61 Ford
 Bob Burdick '61 Pontiac
 Paul Goldsmith '61 Pontiac
 Junior Johnson '61 Pontiac (crashed)

Second qualifier
 Joe Weatherly '61 Pontiac
 Marvin Panch '60 Pontiac
 Cotton Owens '61 Pontiac
 Banjo Matthews '61 Ford
 Darel Dieringer '61 Pontiac
 Joe Lee Johnson '61 Chevrolet
 Emanuel Zervakis '61 Chevrolet
 Jim Reed '61 Chevrolet
 Tom Pistone '61 Pontiac
 Don O'Dell '61 Pontiac

Race Summary 
Prior to the start of the main event, drivers were understandably apprehensive due to the large number of mishaps during the qualifying races. This prompted officials to hold a meeting explaining that rough driving would not be tolerated, and during the race, two cars were black-flagged for driving too slowly to be considered safe. Unofficial estimates placed the total in attendance at over 65,000 people, with speculation of perhaps 100,000. Seventeen drivers in the starting field were designated rookies by NASCAR, and were identified by having their rear bumpers painted with 'Day-glo' paint. Smokey Yunick instructed Panch to not run too close to teammate Roberts so that if Roberts were caught up in any altercations on the track then both cars would not risk being taken out in the same incident.

Fireball Roberts started on the pole for the  event, with Joe Weatherly on the outside front row.  Roberts jumped out front and held the lead through lap 12 when Banjo Mathews took the point position.  Roberts traded the lead position with Mathews, Junior Johnson, Nelson Stacy for the first 42 laps.  At lap 43 Roberts took command of the race in dominating style; and continued to lead for the majority of the race, building a lead of 2 laps over the rest of the field.  Although Richard Petty did not start the race, he did drive in relief for Bob Wellborn from lap 120 through 169, after which Wellborn resumed the driving duties.  On lap 182 driver Darel Dieringer contacted the outside fence, but managed to make repairs in time to finish the race.  There were a total of nine lead changes between five drivers, and the race was completed without a single caution.  Roberts would come back and lead a total of 170 of the 200 laps, including 145 consecutive laps from the 45th to the 187th.  Then on lap 187, with more than a two-lap lead on second place teammate Panch, Roberts' engine failed knocking him out of the race.  Marvin Panch took his first lead of the race with only 13 laps remaining, and held on to reach the checkered flag first, 16 seconds ahead of second-place finisher Joe Weatherly's number 8, who completed the race on one set of tires.  The caution-free event was one of only 3 times that the iconic race ran the entire distance under green; with 1959 and 1962 being the only other 2 times it's occurred.

While Pontiac's factory heads had wanted a new year model to win the race, car owner Yunick was so pleased with Panch's performance that he upped his promised take of 40% to 50% of the winnings, saying: "Tell you what. Anybody good enough to win the race is worth 50 percent to me." Since Daytona did not have a designated "Victory lane" at the time, after the race Panch pulled his winning car into the infield grass, and celebrated the win with Bill France Sr., Yunick, and his family. The victory was Panch's first NASCAR win since the 1957 season, and the only victory of the 1961 season. Years after retiring from the sport, Panch would rebuild a replica of his winning Pontiac and tour the NASCAR circuit.

500 Race results 

 Race results from racing-reference.info

References 

Notes

Citations

Bibliography

External links 
 Video: Petty and Beauchamp crash during qualifying event.
 1961 Daytona 500 trivia from nascar.com

Daytona 500
Daytona 500
NASCAR races at Daytona International Speedway
Daytona 500